Nicola Badalucco (13 May 1929 – 17 June 2015) was an Italian screenwriter. He has written for 38 films since 1969. He was nominated for an Academy Award at the 42nd Academy Awards in the category Original Screenplay for the film The Damned.

He was born in Milan, Italy.

Selected filmography

 The Damned (1969)
 Roma Bene (1971)
  Death in Venice (1971)
  Black Turin (1972)
 Libera, My Love (1973)
  Flatfoot (1973)
 Mean Frank and Crazy Tony (1973)
  Three Tough Guys (1974)
  Policewoman (1974)
  Wanted: Babysitter (1975)
  Due cuori, una cappella (1975)
  Street People (1976)
  And Agnes Chose to Die (1976)
  Black Journal (1977)
  I Am Afraid (1977)
  Goodbye and Amen (1978)
 Closed Circuit (1978)
 A Man on His Knees (1979)
  The Warning (1980)
  Il turno (1981)
  La piovra (1984)
  Mussolini and I (1985)
  Farewell Moscow (1987)
  The Gold Rimmed Glasses (1987)
  The Secret of the Sahara (1987)
  Rossini! Rossini! (1991)
  L'Atlantide (1992)

References

External links

1929 births
2015 deaths
Italian screenwriters
Italian male screenwriters